National Institute of Technology, Delhi (NIT Delhi or NITD) is a premier public technical university located in Delhi, India. It has been declared as an Institute of National Importance by an act of Parliament of India. It is one of the 31 National Institutes of Technology in India.

History 

The National Institute of Technology, Delhi is one of ten NITs established during the 11th Five Year Plan by the Ministry of Education (MOE). The first batch of students was admitted in the year 2010-11, in three undergraduate Bachelor of Technology degree programmes in Computer Science and Engineering, Electronics and Communication Engineering and Electrical and Electronics Engineering. For two years the institute's academic activities were carried out at National Institute of Technology, Warangal, the mentor institute for NIT Delhi. The institute moved to a temporary campus at Dwarka, New Delhi in August 2012, then to a temporary IAMR campus, sector 7, Narela in February 2014.
From academic year 2013-14 the intake in each undergraduate programme was increased to 60 students. A Master of Technology programme in the discipline of Electronics and Communication Engineering with an intake of 15 students was introduced from the academic year 2013-14, followed by a PhD programme that started in January 2014 with an intake of seven research scholars. A Master of Technology programme in the discipline of Power Electronics and Drives with an intake of 15 students was started from the academic session of 2017-18.The academic activities of NIT Delhi were initiated at NIT Warangal in year 2010 .

Campus

Permanent campus

NITD is located about 25 km from Delhi city on National Highway 1 which connects Delhi to Attari. The phase Ist of permanent campus of NIT Delhi has been completed and now the institute functions from the permanent campus.

The permanent campus is conceived as the first vehicle-free campus built on the principles of sustainability and design innovation. The design is driven by the themes of crafting a unique, educational/research environment in the technology/engineering domain for about 5000-8000 students.

Transit campus
NITD used to run at IAMR Campus, Narela. It has currently shifted to permanent campus near GT Karnal Road.

Library

The Central Library, NIT Delhi was established in June 2012 in Dwarka. It moved to its present location IAMR Campus, Narela Institutional Area in February 2014. It is housed on the first floor of the building. The automation of library services is through an RFID library card.

Computer centre

A computer center was established in February 2014 and maintains and manages Wi-Fi facility through rack-mounted blade servers in the campus having high speed (single mode) fiber backbone, managed by Layer 3 Switches providing 600 Mbit/s (1:1) bandwidth Speed.

Sports facilities 

The college has a sports department with arrangements for several indoor and outdoor games. Indoor games include badminton, table tennis, carom and chess. Outdoor games include cricket, football and basketball. There are grounds for football and volleyball along with a cricket pitch and basketball court. Altius - Sports Club organizes an annual sports festival every year in the month of February named ZEAL.

Organisation and administration

Governance
The rules[], regulations and recommendations for the functioning of all NITs are decided by the NIT Council. The members of the council consist of representatives of all NITs and the MHRD. The institute is governed by a Board of Governors. The director of the institute is an ex-officio member of the Board. It decides on all aspects of the running of the institute.

Departments 
Currently, the following five departments are functioning in the institute:-  
 Applied Sciences 
 Computer Science & Engineering 
 Electronics and Communication Engineering 
 Electrical and Electronics Engineering 
 Mechanical Engineering

Academics

Academic programmes
NIT Delhi currently offers only engineering programs in graduate, undergraduate and doctorate level. The Institute offers four-year bachelor's degree programmes in Computer Science and Engineering, Electronics and Communication Engineering and Electrical and Electronics Engineering.
The intake of students to Bachelor of Technology Courses are 60 in each branch. It offers two-year master's degree programmes in Electronics and Communication Engineering and Computer Science and Engineering (Analytics). The intake of students to these postgraduate programmes is 15 each. It offers Doctorate of Philosophy (PhD) degree programmes in Electrical and Electronics Engineering, Electronics and Communication Engineering and Computer Science and Engineering.

Admissions

Undergraduate admission to the institute is through the Joint Entrance Examination (Main) organised by the MHRD's National Testing Agency. The seats are allotted by the Joint Seat Allocation Authority. Fifty percent of seats are reserved under Home State category for Delhi and Chandigarh students. The remaining fifty percent seats are filled by students from other states.

Admission for foreign nationals is carried out by Direct Admission for Students Abroad (DASA) under the MHRD. The admissions are on the basis of the SAT score of the eligible candidates. The number of seats available for foreign nationals in each branch at NIT Delhi is 4 and these are over and above the intake (currently 60) of each branch.

Admissions to the MTech Programmes are made on the basis of performance in the Graduate Aptitude Test in Engineering.

Research

The institute conducts theoretical and experimental research, including in the areas of VLSI and embedded systems, power electronics and drives, advanced magnetohydrodynamics and mathematical modelling of fluid dynamics.

Student life

NIT Delhi has various forms of clubs or student organizations, the Dean Student Welfare being at the helm of all these student organisations. The institution is host to The Cultural Club, Technical club, AlphaZ - The Literature Society, Altius - The Sports Club, Clairvoyance - The Photography Club, Arts Club, Social Reformation Cell (SRC), The Google Developers Student Club (GDSC), among others.

NIT Delhi hosts two major annual events:
Sentience : A Techno-Cultural fest, is born with the idea of bringing together a multitude of talents on a single spectrum. It's the unison of two major and spectacular milestones, TerraTechnica and Saptrang.
Zeal : A Sports fest, which teaches the value of sportsmanship to the students of the college.

References

External links 
 

National Institutes of Technology
Engineering colleges in Delhi
Educational institutions established in 2010
2010 establishments in Delhi